Martin William Hawkins (February 20, 1888 – October 27, 1959) was an American athlete who won the bronze medal in the 110 m hurdles at the 1912 Summer Olympics.

A track star at the University of Oregon, Hawkins later attended law school at Oregon and became a lawyer and judge in Portland.

References

1888 births
1959 deaths
American male hurdlers
Olympic bronze medalists for the United States in track and field
Athletes (track and field) at the 1912 Summer Olympics
Oregon Ducks men's track and field athletes
Track and field athletes from Oregon
Lawyers from Portland, Oregon
Medalists at the 1912 Summer Olympics
20th-century American lawyers